Masty is the second studio album by Pakistani pop rock singer Ali Zafar. The video was produced by Lux and was shot in Malaysia featuring Reema Khan, Meera, and Aaminah Haq.

Track listing

Personnels
Programmed and arranged by Shanny, co-arranged by Ali Zafar (1, 3)

Accolades
Best Male Artist for Masty in MTV Style Awards, 2008

Featured in other media
Ali Zafar performed "Kharayaan Day Naal" in 5th Lux Style Awards, "Sajania" in 6th Lux Style Awards and "Janay Na Koi" in Coke Studio's season 1. His song "Dekha" was featured in 2010 Hollywood film Wall Street: Money Never Sleeps. The remixed version of "Sajania" was officially released online, but not added in album. Zafar also performed on "Masty" and "Aasman" in opening ceremonies of PSL 2016 and PSL 2017 respectively.

Music videos
"Sajania"
"Dekha"
"Masty"
"Aag"
"Aasman"
"Sajania" (Remix)
"Kharayaan Day Naal" (LSA 2006)
"Sajania" (LSA 2007)
"Janay Na Koi" (Coke Studio)
"Aasman" (PSL Reprise)

See also
Ali Zafar discography
London, Paris, New York
Total Siyapaa
Teefa in Trouble

References

External links
Masty on SoundCloud
Buy Masty on Taazi

2006 albums
Ali Zafar albums